Francis Marion Taitt (January 3, 1862 – July 17, 1943) was the ninth bishop of the Episcopal Diocese of Pennsylvania in The Episcopal Church and served from 1931 to 1943.

Career
Taitt was born in Burlington, New Jersey, and moved with his family to Philadelphia at age 8.  He graduated from Philadelphia Divinity School in 1883. He served for four years as curate of Old St. Peter's Church in central Philadelphia, five and a half years as rector of Old Trinity Church in Philadelphia's Southwark neighborhood, and 37 years as rector of Old St. Paul's Church in Chester, Pennsylvania.  On October 4, 1929, he was elected Bishop Coadjustor, and became head of the diocese in 1931 following the death of Bishop Thomas J. Garland.

On June 24, 1940, Taitt offered the invocation at the opening of the second session of the 1940 Republican National Convention.

Death
Bishop Taitt was hospitalized for abdominal surgery at Crozer Hospital, Upland, Pennsylvania, where he died of pneumonia, on July 17, 1943.  His remains were entombed in the crypt of the Episcopal Cathedral, now St. Mary's Church, Roxborough, Philadelphia.

See also
 Episcopal Diocese of Pennsylvania
 Succession of Bishops of The Episcopal Church (U.S.)

References

External links
 Program for Francis Marion Taitt's memorial service, from the archives of St. Clement's Church, via Philadelphia Studies

1862 births
1943 deaths
People from Burlington, New Jersey
Clergy from Philadelphia
Deaths from pneumonia in Pennsylvania
Episcopal bishops of Pennsylvania